The first case of the COVID-19 pandemic was confirmed in the Indian state of Jharkhand on 31 March 2020 as a Malaysian women came positive on the test. The state has confirmed a total of 1,11,366 cases, including 995 deaths and 1,08,761 recoveries, as of 12 December.

Testing and treatment measures
Chaibasa district headquarters of West Singhbhum launched coronavirus swab collection booth which is India's first of the kind. Chaibasa also launched remote-controlled robot called co-bot for providing medicines and food and minimize the contact between the staff and the patients.
After MGM Medical College in Jamshedpur and RIMS in Ranchi, ICMR gave approval for 2 more testing facilities in the state namely, Patliputra Medical College in Dhanbad and TB Sanitorium Hospital in Itki, Ranchi. So, the total testing facility in the state stands at 4.

Timeline

Charts 
The numbers are from data published by Ministry of Health and Family Welfare on their website.
Source: covid19india.org

See also
 COVID-19 pandemic in India

References

COVID-19 pandemic in India by state or union territory
Disasters in Jharkhand
History of Jharkhand (1947–present)